Chains of Gold is a 1991 American made-for-television crime drama film starring and co-written by John Travolta. It was directed by Rod Holcomb and included one of the early performances of Joey Lawrence, who was nominated for Young Artist Award for his role in the movie.

The film premiered on Showtime on September 15, 1991 in United States and was released theatrically in Germany. It was released to DVD on December 15, 1998.

The opening credits state that Chains of Gold is "based on actual events", though details of the actual events themselves remain difficult to pin down.

The film was shot in Miami, Florida, USA. It is the only film so far written by twice-nominated Academy Award actor John Travolta.

Plot
Scott Barnes (Travolta) is a former ad executive turned social worker living in Miami. He is also a recovering alcoholic who stopped drinking after accidentally killing his son in a drunk-driving accident. One of his cases is Tommy (Joey Lawrence) a street kid who has been selling crack for an organization called the Youth Incentive Program (YIP). Barnes is unaware of this, but suspects something when Tommy buys expensive gifts for his mother and sister. He also notices the YIP tattoo on Tommy's arm.

Tommy is kidnapped by YIP and forced to package crack into vials in an abandoned building with many other children. After Tommy does not come home for several days, his sister calls the morgue and they inform her he is dead. Barnes goes to the morgue to identify Tommy, but discovers it is not him, although he sees the YIP tattoo on the corpse. While trying to find Tommy, he witnesses a shootout where one of the gunmen has a YIP tattoo. He goes to see Sgt. Palco (Bernie Casey), who tells him about YIP. Barnes, convinced Tommy has been kidnapped by YIP, then talks to the head of the narcotics division, Lt. Ortega (Hector Elizondo) who tries to convince him to stay away from the gang.

While looking for Tommy in the streets, Barnes notices the YIP henchman James (Ramon Franco) and follows him to a nightclub. There, he meets his old girlfriend Jackie (Marilu Henner) and is shocked when he sees her speaking to James. After sleeping together, Barnes learns Jackie is a lawyer for YIP and tells her he wants to get into the organization to rescue Tommy. After some consternation, Jackie tells Barnes that YIP is willing to induct him as a member.

Barnes goes to meet with Carlos (Benjamin Bratt), the head of YIP, who wants him to help expand the organization into the suburbs. James then shows him around the organization and leads him to the warehouse where Tommy is being held. Tommy tries escaping and is taken to the Madison House, an abandoned factory where members of YIP who commit transgressions are killed. Barnes finds out about this from one of Tommy's friends. Barnes is taken to the Madison House and sees Tommy. He then goes to see Lt. Ortega, who tells him if he interferes further, he will be charged with conspiracy to distribute narcotics. One of Carlos' henchmen sees Barnes enter the police station and informs Carlos, who now believes him to be an FBI agent.

Barnes goes to see Jackie and discovers that she has been killed by Carlos' henchmen, who then attack him. Barnes escapes but is quickly kidnapped by the henchmen. He is taken to the Madison House and thrown into an elevator pit filled with alligators, but gets caught in the wiring and manages to escape. Barnes finds Carlos and the two have a fist-fight just as the police raid the building. Barnes finally manages to punch Carlos down into the elevator pit, killing him. The police arrest the rest of the YIP members and Barnes drives away with Tommy in a police car.

Cast
John Travolta as Scott Barnes
Marilu Henner as Jackie
Héctor Elizondo as Lieutenant Ortega
Joey Lawrence as Tommy Burke
Bernie Casey as Sergeant Falco
Benjamin Bratt as Carlos
Conchata Ferrell as Martha Burke
Tammy Lauren as Rachel Burke

References

External links 

1991 television films
1991 films
1991 crime drama films
1990s action films
American crime drama films
Films shot in Miami
Showtime (TV network) films
Films scored by Trevor Jones
Films about runaways
Films directed by Rod Holcomb
American drama television films
1990s English-language films
1990s American films